Symphyotrichum hintonii (formerly Aster hintonii) is a species of perennial, herbaceous, flowering plant in the family Asteraceae native to Guerrero, Mexico.

Citations

References

hintonii
Flora of Guerrero
Endemic flora of Mexico
Plants described in 1989
Taxa named by Guy L. Nesom